Cha Cha Real Smooth is a 2022 American comedy-drama film written, produced, and directed by Cooper Raiff. The plot centers on a 22-year-old college graduate (Raiff) who starts making money as a party starter while he also strikes up a relationship with a 32-year-old mother (played by Dakota Johnson, who also produced the film). The cast also includes Raúl Castillo, Odeya Rush, Evan Assante, Vanessa Burghardt, Brad Garrett, and Leslie Mann.

It premiered at the 2022 Sundance Film Festival on January 23, 2022, and was released in limited theaters and streaming on Apple TV+ on June 17, 2022. The film received generally positive reviews from critics.

Plot
Twelve-year-old New Jersey resident Andrew asks a party host out on a date; she rejects him due to their age difference. Ten years later, Andrew's girlfriend, Maya, moves to Barcelona to finish her Fulbright. Andrew is asked to take his twelve-year-old brother David to a bat mitzvah, where Andrew encourages the kids to dance. He meets Domino and her autistic daughter, Lola. Andrew's peers have been spreading rumors about Domino. Andrew introduces himself and manages to take Lola to the dance floor, surprising Domino. The mothers at the party take notice of his charisma and agree to hire Andrew as a party starter at upcoming bar and bat mitzvahs. He dubs himself the Jig Conductor and plans to use the money to reunite with Maya in Barcelona.

Andrew is removed as DJ from his next party for confronting a child who bullied Lola. He finds Domino in the restroom, covered in blood. He and Lola find her a change of clothes; Andrew drives them home. Domino tells Andrew she has a fiancé, Joseph, working in Chicago. She reveals the blood was not from her period but caused by a recent miscarriage. Domino hires Andrew as Lola's sitter. They kiss. Andrew later has sex with his friend, Macy. Andrew spends the next day talking to David and interviewing for a job as an intern. Andrew meets Joseph at a party and later spends time with Domino and Lola. Andrew starts to think Maya is dating someone in Barcelona; his mother comforts him. Andrew helps Lola go to bed by scratching her back, an activity she had previously only allowed Domino to do. Andrew sees Domino and Joseph in a bad mood before he leaves.

Andrew gets the intern job. He and Domino talk about her engagement with Joseph and they kiss. Back home, Andrew and David argue for a bit. Joseph fires Andrew from his job as Lola's sitter. David almost experiences his first kiss but leaves to stop some kids bullying Lola. A fight between Andrew's family and the other guests at the bar mitzvah ensues. Andrew tells Domino he loves her. She rejects his advances, telling him that she is in love with Joseph, even when it does not appear she is. Joseph thanks Andrew for taking care of his family. Andrew decides he does not want to go to Barcelona. Instead, he plans to move out. Andrew and Domino say goodbye. She encourages him to live his life to the fullest before making any commitments. David tells Andrew he had his first kiss at school. Six months later, Domino and Joseph are married, while Andrew has fun dancing at a bar with his friends.

Cast
 Cooper Raiff as Andrew, a Tulane University graduate who has recently moved back home
 Javien Mercado as twelve-year-old Andrew
 Dakota Johnson as Domino
 Evan Assante as David, Andrew's younger brother
 Vanessa Burghardt as Lola, Domino's daughter
 Leslie Mann as Lisa, Andrew's mother
 Brad Garrett as Stepdad Greg
 Raúl Castillo as Joseph, Domino's fiancé
 Colton Osorio as Rodrigo, David's friend
 Amara Pedroso Saquel as Maya, Andrew's girlfriend
 Odeya Rush as Macy, Andrew's friend from high school
 Brooklyn Sloane Ramirez as Margaret
 Kelly O'Sullivan as Bella

Production
The film was announced in March 2021, with Dakota Johnson and Cooper Raiff set to star. In August, Leslie Mann, Brad Garrett, Raúl Castillo, Odeya Rush, Vanessa Burghardt, Evan Assante and Colton Osorio joined the cast. Principal photography began on August 12, 2021, with filming taking place in Pittsburgh.

Release
It premiered at the 2022 Sundance Film Festival on January 23, 2022. Afterwards, Apple TV+ acquired the film's distribution rights for $15 million. The film showed at SXSW on March 18, 2022. The film also screened at the Tribeca Film Festival in June 2022. It was released on June 17, 2022, simultaneously in limited theaters and on Apple TV+.

Reception

Critical response 
 

Christy Lemire of Roger Ebert.com gave the film a positive review writing, "Raiff's ambition to break free from sentimental formula and forge a path of his own is clear, making him an exciting young filmmaker to watch."

Film critic Manohla Dargis of The New York Times panned the film, writing, "It's derivative and unpersuasive, and as pandering as any big studio soft sell" adding about the film's central romance: "Their relationship never makes sense; but, then, neither does most of the movie."

Awards and nominations

References

External links
 
 Official screenplay

2022 films
2022 comedy-drama films
American comedy-drama films
Apple TV+ original films
Films about autism
Films directed by Cooper Raiff
Films set in New Jersey
Films shot in Pittsburgh
Livingston, New Jersey
Films about mother–daughter relationships
Sundance Film Festival award winners
2020s English-language films
2020s American films
2022 independent films
American independent films